Hordaland County Municipality was the regional governing administration of the old Hordaland county in Norway. The county municipality was established in its most recent form on 1 January 1976 when the law was changed to allow elected county councils in Norway. The county municipality was dissolved on 1 January 2020, when Hordaland was merged with the neighboring Sogn og Fjordane county, creating the new Vestland county which is led by the Vestland County Municipality. 

The main responsibilities of the county municipality included the running of 46 upper secondary schools, with 17,000 pupils. It managed all the county roadways, public transport, dental care, culture, and cultural heritage sites in the county.

County government
The Hordaland county council was made up of 57 representatives that were elected every four years. The council essentially acted as a Parliament or legislative body for the county and it met several times each year. The council was divided into standing committees and an executive board which met considerably more often. Both the council and executive board were led by the County Mayor who held the executive powers of the county. The final County Mayor was Anne Gine Hestetun of the Labour Party, while her deputy was Rune Haugsdal.

County council
The party breakdown of the council was as follows:

Transport

Public transport in Hordaland was the responsibility of the county municipality, including the city buses in the city of Bergen. Control of the city buses was transferred from the city to the county on 1 January 2008.

In 2007, the county municipality created the transit authority called "Skyss" that would market public transport while it would be operated by private companies based on public service obligation contracts. Prior to this, most routes had been operated by the private company Tide Buss and its predecessors.

References

External links
 Official site

 
Hordaland
County municipalities of Norway
Organisations based in Bergen
1838 establishments in Norway
2020 disestablishments in Norway